Labyrinth of Horror is a 1921 Austrian silent film directed by Michael Curtiz.

Cast
 Lucy Doraine as Maud Hartley
 Alfons Fryland as Edward Stephenson
 Max Devrient as M. Stephenson
 Paul Askonas as Thomas Racton
 Mathilde Danegger as Gabrielle Racton
 Jean Ducret as George Hartley

References

External links

1921 films
1921 horror films
Austrian black-and-white films
Austrian silent feature films
Austrian horror films
Films directed by Michael Curtiz
Silent horror films